Chris Summers may refer to:
Chris Summers (drummer) (born 1970), Norwegian musician
Chris Summers (footballer) (born 1972), Welsh footballer
Chris Summers (ice hockey) (born 1988), hockey player 
Chris Summers (kicker) (born 1988), American football placekicker and punter
Chris Summers (wide receiver) (born 1989), American football wide receiver
Christopher Summers or Corsair, a Marvel Comics character